Bulqizë is a municipality in Dibër County, northeastern Albania. The municipality consists of the administrative units of Fushë-Bulqizë, Gjoricë, Martanesh, Ostren, Shupenzë, Trebisht, Zerqan with Bulqizë constituting its seat. As of the Institute of Statistics estimate from the 2011 census, there were 8,177 people residing in Bulqizë and 32,210 in Bulqizë Municipality.

Demographic history 
Bulqizë is recorded in the Ottoman defter of 1467 as a hass-ı mir-liva and derbendci settlement in the vilayet of Dulgoberda. Although the register's complete survey on the village is missing, the following household heads are attested: Dimitri Bogdani, Kolë Sharqini, Gjin Kimeza, Gjin Kolandi, Nikolla Budi, Martin Bardi, Progon Buljani, Maqe Kimëza, Istvan Nenada, Progon Bogdani, Dimitri, Todor Damëza, Banek Alakasa, Nikolla Mesina, Budi, Gjergj Garuja, and Gjergj Iglat (from i gjatë, "the tall").

Geography 

Bulqizë lies in the lower north-east of Albania adjacent to the border with North Macedonia. The municipalities of Mati and Tirana lie to the west while at the south is the municipality of Librazhd. There is a significant sources of chromium, which supports most of the economy of the area.

Notes

References

External links 

bulqiza.gov.al – Official Website 

 
Administrative units of Bulqizë
Municipalities in Dibër County
Towns in Albania